Antonia Ignacia Canales Pacheco (born 16 October 2002) is a Chilean footballer who plays as a goalkeeper for Spanish side Real Oviedo.

Club career
A product of Universidad Católica, she switched to Colo-Colo in 2022. 

In 2023, she moved abroad and joined Real Oviedo in the Spanish Segunda División.

International career
She was part of the Chilean Football team in the football competition at the 2020 Summer Olympics.

References

External links
 

2002 births
Living people
Chilean women's footballers
Chilean expatriate women's footballers
Chile women's international footballers
Chile women's youth international footballers
Footballers at the 2020 Summer Olympics
Olympic footballers of Chile
Club Deportivo Universidad Católica footballers
Colo-Colo (women) footballers
Real Oviedo (women) players
Chilean expatriate sportspeople in Spain
Expatriate women's footballers in Spain
Women's association football goalkeepers
Place of birth missing (living people)